Current History is the oldest extant United States-based publication devoted exclusively to contemporary world affairs. The magazine was founded in 1914 by George Washington Ochs Oakes, brother of The New York Times publisher Adolph Ochs, in order to provide detailed coverage of World War I. Current History was published by the New York Times Company from its founding until 1936. Since 1942 it has been owned by members of the Redmond family; its current publisher is Daniel Mark Redmond.

Current History, based in Philadelphia, maintains no institutional, political, or governmental affiliation. It is published monthly, from September through May. Seven issues each year are devoted to world regions (China and East Asia, Russia and Eurasia, the Middle East, Latin America, Europe, South Asia, and Africa); one issue covers current global trends; and one issue addresses a special theme such as climate change or global governance. The magazine has followed this practice of devoting each issue to a single region or theme since 1953. Each issue includes a chronology of major international events, and most contain a book review section and an article devoted to commentary.

Contributors to Current History in the publication's early years included George Bernard Shaw, Winston Churchill, Charles A. Beard, Allan Nevins, and Henry Steele Commager.  Grover Clark was its Beijing correspondent. More recently, the journal has featured authors such as James Schlesinger, Francis Fukuyama, Jeffrey Sachs, Bruce Riedel, Leslie H. Gelb, Bruce Russett, Elizabeth Economy, Charles Kupchan, Ivo Daalder, Joseph Cirincione, Phebe Marr, Juan Cole, Bruce Gilley, and Marina Ottaway.

Shortly after Current History began publishing in 1914, its editor, Ochs Oakes, decided that a magazine recording “history in the making” should maintain as regular contributors a group of historians and social scientists. He enlisted the help of a Harvard historian, Albert Bushnell Hart, in organizing the journal’s initial group of contributing editors.

Current Historys board of contributing editors today includes Catherine Boone (The London School of Economics and Political Science); Bruce Cumings (University of Chicago); Deborah Davis (Yale University); David B. H. Denoon (New York University); Larry Diamond (Stanford University); Michele Dunne (Carnegie Endowment for International Peace); Barry Eichengreen (University of California, Berkeley); C. Christine Fair (Georgetown University); Sumit Ganguly (Indiana University); Marshall Goldman (Wellesley College); G. John Ikenberry (Princeton University); Michael T. Klare (Hampshire College); Joshua Kurlantzick (Council on Foreign Relations); Michael McFaul (Stanford University, currently on leave); Rajan Menon (Lehigh University); Augustus Richard Norton (Boston University); Joseph Nye (Harvard University); Michael Shifter (Inter-American Dialogue); Arturo Valenzuela (Georgetown University, currently on leave); and Jeffrey Wasserstrom (University of California, Irvine). The publication's editor is Alan Sorensen.

The magazine was linked to an international scandal in the run-up to World War II. The New York Times had sold Current History in 1936 to the editor Merle Tracy; in 1939 it was sold again, to an ownership group that included Joseph Hilton Smyth, who also acquired such magazines as The Living Age and The North American Review.  Smyth's association with Current History ended the same year, but he and two associates, in connection with their publishing activities, were later convicted of acting as agents for the Japanese government without registering with the State Department. Current History addressed this episode in its October 1942 issue, maintaining that Smyth during the months that he held an ownership interest in the publication did not control editorial policies."

According to the Journal Citation Reports, the journal has a 2014 impact factor of 0.127, ranking it 149th out of 161 journals in the category "Political Science" and 82nd out of 85 journals in the category "International Relations".

References

External links
 Current History's website
 Current History at the HathiTrust

English-language journals
International relations journals
Publications established in 1914
Mass media in Philadelphia
9 times per year journals